Dean Charles Talafous (born August 25, 1953) is an American former professional ice hockey player. He played 497 regular season games in the National Hockey League (NHL) between 1974 and 1981 for the Atlanta Flames, Minnesota North Stars and New York Rangers as a right winger.

College
Talafous played for the Wisconsin Badgers where he helped the team win a National Championship in 1973, and was named the tournament's Most Outstanding Player. Talafous scored the winning goal in the championship game.

Playing career
Talafous was drafted 53rd overall by the Atlanta Flames in the 1973 NHL Entry Draft. He scored his first NHL goal on December 12, 1974 at Washington in a 2-2 tie.  It was the only goal Talafous scored as an Atlanta Flame. Talafous played 18 games for the Flames before being traded to the Minnesota North Stars. In international hockey he played for the United States in the 1976 Canada Cup and 1981 Canada Cup. In 1978 Talafous signed as a free agent with the New York Rangers.

On December 30, 1981,  the Rangers traded him with Jere Gillis to the Quebec Nordiques for Robbie Ftorek, however, Talafous decided to retire after learning that the Nordiques would not offer him a contract past the end of the season. The Rangers were then forced to give up Pat Hickey as compensation.

Coaching

Juniors
Head of player development - [ Hudson Crusaders ] MJHL
Head Coach - St. Paul Vulcans USHL

Head coaching record

After hockey
Talafous lives in Hudson, Wisconsin, and founded Total Hockey Training with his wife, Jax, and son, Pete; Talafous retired in 2011 and Pete now runs the organization as Exceed Hockey. In 2013 Talafous was inducted in the Badger Athletic Hall of Fame.

Awards and honors

Career statistics

Regular season and playoffs

International

References

External links

Hockeydraftcentral.com profile
Total Hockey Training

1953 births
Living people
Alaska Anchorage Seawolves men's ice hockey coaches
American ice hockey coaches
American men's ice hockey right wingers
Atlanta Flames draft picks
Atlanta Flames players
Cincinnati Stingers draft picks
Ice hockey people from Duluth, Minnesota
Minnesota North Stars players
New York Rangers players
Omaha Knights (CHL) players
University of Alaska Anchorage people
Wisconsin Badgers men's ice hockey players
Wisconsin–River Falls Falcons men's ice hockey coaches
NCAA men's ice hockey national champions